Chile competed at the 1992 Summer Olympics in Barcelona, Spain. Twelve competitors, nine men and three women, took part in twelve events in seven sports.

Competitors
The following is the list of number of competitors in the Games.

Athletics

Men's Marathon
 Jaime Ojeda — 2:28.39 (→ 62nd place)

Men's Pole Vault
Tómas Riether

Men's Shot Put
 Gert Weil
 Qualification — 19.41 m (→ did not advance)

Boxing

Men's Middleweight
Ricardo Araneda
 First Round — Defeated Luis Hugo Mendez (URU), RSC-2 (02:20)
 Second Round — Lost to Lee Seung-Bae (KOR), 8:12

Cycling

One male cyclists represented Chile in 1992.

Men's road race
 Miguel Droguett

Men's points race
 Miguel Droguett

Sailing

Shooting

Table tennis

Tennis

Women's Singles Competition
 Paulina Sepúlveda
First Round – Lost to Sandra Cecchini (Italy) 2-6 3-6

See also
Chile at the 1991 Pan American Games

References

External links
Official Olympic Reports

Nations at the 1992 Summer Olympics
1992
Summer Olympics